The Blockade Runner Badge or the Badge for Blockade Runners was a World War II German military decoration awarded for service on warships or merchant vessels that attempted to break through the British Blockade of Germany (1939–1945). It was instituted on 1 April 1941 upon the order of Adolf Hitler and first awarded on 1 July of the same year to Hugo Olendorff.

Design
The badge was designed by Otto Placzeck in Berlin. It was in either tombac or zinc and featured a ship with a large German eagle grasping a swastika on its bow. Around the circumference of the badge is a chain, through which the ship is cutting. The eagle was silvered whilst the rest of the badge was a dark gray colour.

The badge was worn on the left breast pocket of the uniform.  A smaller half-size version was awarded for use by civilians and members of the merchant marine.

Notes

References 

Awards established in 1941
Military awards and decorations of Nazi Germany
Blockades
1941 establishments in Germany